Greene County Courthouse may refer to:

 Old Greene County Courthouse, Eutaw, Alabama
 Greene County Courthouse (Arkansas), Paragould, Arkansas
 Greene County Courthouse (Georgia), Greensboro, Georgia
 Greene County Courthouse (Illinois), Carrollton, Illinois
 Greene County Courthouse (Indiana), Bloomfield, Indiana
 Greene County Courthouse (Iowa), Jefferson, Iowa
 Greene County Courthouse (Missouri), Springfield, Missouri
 Greene County Courthouse (Mississippi), Leakesville, Mississippi, a Mississippi Landmark
 Greene County Courthouse (North Carolina), Snow Hill, North Carolina
 Greene County Courthouse (Ohio), Xenia, Ohio
 Greene County Courthouse (Virginia), Stanardsville, Virginia

See also
Green County Courthouse (disambiguation)